Angusaurus is an extinct genus of trematosaurian temnospondyl within the family Trematosauridae.

See also
 Prehistoric amphibian
 List of prehistoric amphibians

References 

Trematosaurs
Fossil taxa described in 1990
Prehistoric amphibian genera